The 2004 Deutsche Tourenwagen Masters was the eighteenth season of premier German touring car championship and also fifth season under the moniker of Deutsche Tourenwagen Masters since the series' resumption in 2000. There were 10 championship race weekend with one round each, plus a non-championship round at the streets of Shanghai. Originally each track hosted one race each with the exception of Hockenheimring (two races, premier and finale). Each track hosted one race, with the exception of Hockenheim, which hosted two. As in 2003 each weekend compromised one race of circa one hour and with two compulsory pit stops for each contender.

Changes for 2004
 The coupé style cars were replaced by four-door sedans. Smaller independent teams were allowed to run the year-old coupes for one more season due to cost reasons. While the first-generation 4.0-litre V8 naturally-aspirated engines still remained to continue until 2018 despite transition to sedans.
 Audi entered as an official works team for the first time since 1992 season.
 A non-championship one-off race was held at the streets of Shanghai, China.
 A1-Ring in Austria was removed from the schedule. The track was to undergo major repairs, but those were not completed (see article on A1-Ring for full story).
 DTM did not return to Donington Park in the United Kingdom for 2004. In 2006 a DTM race in Britain did return to the calendar, but with it being held at Brands Hatch.
Shell became official control fuel partner from 2004 season until mid-2005 season.
The new Dunlop SP Sport Maxx DTM tyre sizes were altered for the first time. With 265/660-R18 (10.4/25.9-R18) on the fronts and 280/660-R18 (11.0/25.9-R18) on the rears to improve mechanical grip and lateral acceleration.

Teams and drivers
The following manufacturers, teams and drivers competed in the championship rounds of the 2004 Deutsche Tourenwagen Masters. All teams competed with tyres supplied by Dunlop.

Notes
 Peter Terting and Rinaldo Capello made one-off appearances at the non-championship round in Shanghai racing Audis, filling in for the absent Opels of Laurent Aïello and Peter Dumbreck.

Race calendar and winners

Championship standings

Scoring system
Points are awarded to the top 8 classified finishers.

Drivers' championship

† Driver retired, but was classified as they completed 90% of the winner's race distance.

‡ Non Championship Round

Teams' championship

Deutsche Tourenwagen Masters seasons
Deutsche Tourenwagen Masters